Vietto is a surname. Notable people with the surname include:

Federico Vietto (born 1998), Argentine footballer 
Luciano Vietto (born 1993), Argentine footballer
René Vietto (1914–1988), French cyclist